An election for Kildare County Council was held in 1899 as part of the wider 1899 Irish local elections. It was the first election following the reorganization of Irish local government caused by the Local Government (Ireland) Act 1898, and saw a considerable change of power from the largely Protestant traditional landowning class to the largely Catholic tenants.

The council was composed of 30 members, of whom 21 were elected representatives, whilst the remaining nine were Ex officio members; 5 were members by virtue of being Chairmen of Rural district councils, whilst 3 were nominees of the grand jury.

In contrast to County Mayo, the United Irish League played no role in the election, and didn't have any Kildare branches until December 1899. Whilst many candidates proclaimed themselves as nationalists, they were moderates, with no candidates advocating Irish republican sentiments.

Aggregate results

Ward results

References

1899 Irish local elections
1899
1899 in Irish politics